The Technion – Israel Institute of Technology in Haifa, Israel, has had 16 presidents and directors in more than a century of history, as of .

The following is a list of presidents of the Technion ordered by date:
 Arthur Blok (1924–1925)
 Eng. Max Hecker (1925–1927)
 Shmuel Pewsner (1927–1929)
 Prof. Aharon Tcherniavsky (1927–1929)
 Prof. Joseph Breuer (1930–1931)
 Dr. Shlomo Kaplansky (1931–1950)
 Lt. Gen. (Res.) Yaakov Dori (1951–1965)
 Alexander Goldberg (1965–1973)
 Maj. Gen. (Res.) Amos Horev (1973–1982)
 Prof. Josef Singer (1982–1986)
 Dr. Max W. Reis (1986–1990)
 Prof. Zehev Tadmor (1990–1998)
 Maj. Gen. (Res.) Amos Lapidot (1998–2001)
 Prof. Yitzhak Apeloig (2001–2009)
 Prof. Peretz Lavie (2009–2019)
 Prof. Uri Sivan (2019–present)

See also
 History of the Technion

References

Technion – Israel Institute of Technology
Lists of Israeli people
History of Haifa
Haifa-related lists
Presidents of the Technion